The Fawn-class destroyer was a class of two destroyers that served in the Royal Navy: , and .

References

Destroyer classes
Ship classes of the Royal Navy